A single-decker bus or single-decker is a bus that has a single deck for passengers.  Normally the use of the term single-decker refers to a standard two-axled rigid bus, in direct contrast to the use of the term double-decker bus, which is essentially a bus with two passenger decks and a staircase. These types of single-deckers may feature one or more doors, and varying internal combustion engine positions. The majority of single-deckers have a length of up to 12 metres, although some exceptions of longer buses exist. They also typically weigh between 11 and 14 tons.

In regions where double-deckers are not common, the term single-decker may lack common usage, as in one sense, all other main types of bus have a single deck.  Also, the term may become synonymous with the name transit bus or related terms, which can correctly be applied to double-deckers too.

With the exception of regions of major double deck or articulated bus operation, usually major urban areas such as Hong Kong, cities in the United Kingdom and Singapore, the single decker is the standard mode of public transport bus travel, increasingly with low floor features.

With their origins in van chassis, minibuses are not usually considered single-deckers, although modern minibus designs blur this distinction.  Midibuses can also be regarded as both included with and separate from standard single-deckers, in terms of full size length and vehicle weights, although again design developments have seen this distinction blurred.  Some coach style buses that do not have underfloor luggage space can also be correctly termed as single-deckers, with some sharing standard bus chassis designs, such as the Volvo B10M, with a different body style applied.

Notable examples of single-decker buses (excluding coaches, trolleybuses, midibuses and minibuses)

 Alexander Dennis Enviro200
 Alexander Dennis Enviro300
 Alexander Dennis Enviro350H
 BYD K9
 Daewoo BC212MA
 Daewoo BS105
 DAC 112UDM
 DAF SB220
 Dennis Dart
 Dennis Falcon
 Dennis Lance/Lance SLF
 Designline Olympus
 Hino Blue Ribbon
 Hino Rainbow
 Ikarus 260
 Irisbus Agoraline
 Irisbus Citelis
 Isuzu Erga
 Isuzu Cubic
 Iveco TurboCity
 Iveco Urbanway
 MAN NL262
 MAN NLxx3F
 MAZ-103
 MAZ-203
 Mercedes-Benz Citaro
 Mercedes-Benz O305
 Mercedes-Benz O405
 Mercedes-Benz O500M/U
 Mercedes-Benz OC 500 LE
 Mercedes-Benz OF-OH
 Mitsubishi Fuso Aero Star
 Nissan Diesel Space Runner RA
 Nova Bus LFS
 New Flyer Low Floor
 Optare Excel
 Optare Tempo
 Optare Tempo SR
 Orion VII
 Renault PR100.2
 Rocar Autodromo 812U
 Rocar De Simon U412
 Scania Citywide
 Scania K UB
 Scania L113
 Scania L94UB
 Scania N UB
 Scania N113
 Scania N94UB
 Scania OmniCity
 Solaris Urbino 12
 Thaco TB120CT
 VDL SB200
 VDL SB250
 Volvo B7RLE
 Volvo B8RLE
 Volvo B9L
 Volvo B10B
 Volvo B10BLE
 Volvo B10M
 Volvo B12BLE
 Optare Prisma
 Optare Solo
 Optare Solo SR
 Optare Solo Plus
 Optare Versa

See also

 Tram
 Bus rapid transit
 List of buses

References

External links

Buses by type